Martin Damm and Cyril Suk were the defending champions but lost in the semifinals to Michaël Llodra and Fabrice Santoro.

Wayne Arthurs and Paul Hanley won in the final 6–1, 6–3 against Llodra and Santoro.

Seeds
Champion seeds are indicated in bold text while text in italics indicates the round in which those seeds were eliminated. All eight seeded teams received byes to the second round.

Draw

Final

Top half

Bottom half

References
 2003 Internazionali BNL d'Italia Men's Doubles Draw

Men's Doubles
Italian Open - Doubles